The Florida circuit courts are state courts, and are trial courts of original jurisdiction for most controversies. In Florida, the circuit courts are one of four types of courts created by the Florida Constitution (the other three being The Florida Supreme Court, Florida district courts of appeal, and Florida county courts).

The circuit courts primarily handle civil cases where the amount in controversy is greater than $30,000, and felony criminal cases, as well as appeals from county courts.

Additionally, since circuit courts are constitutional courts as are courts of appeals, state circuit courts operate under the constitutional consideration of that state's constitution that operates under the Constitution of the United States of America. Therefore, Supreme Court justices can be assigned to state circuit courts of appeals and circuit courts where there is a need by the discretion of the Department of Justice and the Attorney General of the federal government.

Circuits 

There are 20 judicial circuits in Florida, all but five of which span multiple counties.  They are:

 First Circuit – Escambia, Okaloosa, Santa Rosa and Walton
 Second Circuit – Franklin, Gadsden, Jefferson, Leon, Liberty, and Wakulla
 Third Circuit – Columbia, Dixie, Hamilton, Lafayette, Madison, Suwannee and Taylor
 Fourth Circuit – Clay, Duval and Nassau
 Fifth Circuit – Citrus, Hernando, Lake, Marion and Sumter
 Sixth Circuit – Pasco and Pinellas
 Seventh Circuit – Flagler, Putnam, St. Johns and Volusia
 Eighth Circuit – Alachua, Baker, Bradford, Gilchrist, Levy, and Union
 Ninth Circuit – Orange and Osceola
 Tenth Circuit – Hardee, Highlands, and Polk
 Eleventh Circuit – Miami-Dade
 Twelfth Circuit – DeSoto, Manatee, and Sarasota
 Thirteenth Circuit – Hillsborough
 Fourteenth Circuit – Bay, Calhoun, Gulf, Holmes, Jackson and Washington
 Fifteenth Circuit – Palm Beach
 Sixteenth Circuit – Monroe
 Seventeenth Circuit – Broward
 Eighteenth Circuit – Brevard and Seminole
 Nineteenth Circuit – Indian River, Martin, Okeechobee and St. Lucie
 Twentieth Circuit – Charlotte, Collier, Glades, Hendry and Lee

Jurisdiction
Florida circuit courts have original jurisdiction not vested in the county courts, direct review of administrative action, and the power to issue writs of mandamus, quo warranto, certiorari, prohibition, and habeas corpus, as well as any other writs necessary to exercise their jurisdiction.

As authorized by the legislature, and in addition to the power to issue various injunctions and other necessary orders, the circuit courts more specifically have the following jurisdiction:

Original jurisdiction
Original jurisdiction is as follows:
 "[A]ll actions at law not cognizable by the county courts . . . ." Therefore, all actions except: most misdemeanor cases, violations of municipal and county ordinances, some disputes occurring in homeowners' associations, and cases where the amount in controversy is equal to or less than $30,000 ("Exclusive of interest, costs, attorneys fees, except those within the exclusive jurisdiction of the circuit courts").
 "[P]roceedings relating to the settlement of the estates of decedents and minors, the granting of letters testamentary, guardianship, involuntary hospitalization, the determination of incompetency, and other jurisdiction usually pertaining to courts of probate . . . ."
 All cases of equity, including those related to juveniles, except for traffic offenses.
 Felonies.
 All cases involving the legality of state tax assessment, toll, or denial of refund.
 Ejectment (But not eviction, which may be brought in county court).
 Title and boundaries of real property.

Appellate jurisdiction
Appellate jurisdiction is as follows:
 Appeals from county courts (except from orders or judgments declaring invalid a state statute or provision of the state constitution, or any orders or judgments certified by the county court as a matter of great public importance and accepted for review by a District Court of Appeal).
 Appeals from final administrative orders of local government code enforcement boards.

Election
Circuit court judges are elected by the voters of the circuits in nonpartisan, contested elections against other persons who choose to qualify as candidates for the position. Circuit court judges serve for six-year terms, and they are subject to the same disciplinary standards and procedures as Supreme Court Justices and district court judges.

See also
 Judiciary of Florida

References

External links
 Map of District Court's Jurisdiction
 The Florida Rules of Civil Procedure

Florida state courts
Florida
Courts and tribunals with year of establishment missing